Declaration is the debut studio album from The Alarm. It was released in 1984 by IRS Records. The album was released initially on vinyl and cassette. A CD version was released in the U.S. by June 1984.  An extended re-master version was released in 2000, including extra tracks.

Critical reception

Rolling Stone magazine wrote: "This is one of the best new live bands I heard last year, and they've put a lot of that power into their first album."   William Ruhlmann wrote in a mixed to favorable review in AllMusic "the Alarm seemed to play every song as if it was the climax of their set. In the short term, that excited listeners, however; Declaration was a number six hit in England and broke through to the Top 50 in the U.S. In retrospect, it's more smoke than fire."

Track listing
All songs written by Eddie Macdonald and Mike Peters, except where noted.
Side one
"Declaration" – 0:45
"Marching On" – 3:35
"Where Were You Hiding When the Storm Broke?" – 2:56
"Third Light" – 3:25
"Sixty Eight Guns" – 5:49
"We Are the Light" – 3:16

Side two
"Shout to the Devil" (Macdonald, Peters, David Sharp) – 4:10
"Blaze of Glory" (Macdonald, Peters, Sharp) – 6:04
"Tell Me" (Sharp) – 3:14
"The Deceiver" – 5:05
"The Stand (Prophecy)" (Macdonald, Peters, Sharp) – 1:15
"Howling Wind" – 6:44

2000 Remastered CD edition bonus tracks
"The Peace Train"
"Reason 41"
"Second Generation"
"Unbreak the Promise"
"The Chant Has Just Begun"
"Bells of Rhymney"
"Bound for Glory"
"Absolute Reality"

Single releases
"Marching On", "The Stand", "Sixty Eight Guns" and "Where Were You Hiding When the Storm Broke?" had already been released as singles before the album went on sale. "The Deceiver" was the only single to be released from the album after this time.

Personnel
The Alarm
Mike Peters – vocals, acoustic guitar, harmonica 
Dave Sharp – acoustic and electric guitars, vocals
Eddie Macdonald – bass, electric guitar, bowed guitar, vocals
Twist – drums, percussion, vocals

Production
Alan Shacklock – producer
Chris Porter – engineer
Michael Ross, Simon Adamcewski – artwork
Robert Mason – illustrations
Stephen Oliver – photography

Notes

1984 debut albums
The Alarm albums
I.R.S. Records albums
Illegal Records albums
Albums produced by Alan Shacklock